Marry Me is an American romantic comedy television miniseries directed by James Hayman and written by Barbara Hall, starring Lucy Liu. It aired on Lifetime on December 12 and 13, 2010.

Plot
Rae Ann Carter is an artist turned social worker who is looking for the right man to marry. Just as she thinks she has one in Adam, both she and Adam break up. Unsure, she tries again with Luke, who wants to be the right one: then another man, Harry, takes an interest in her followed by Adam's return. With three men buzzing around her like bees, Rae Ann has a decision to make.

Cast
 Lucy Liu as Rae Ann Carter
 Steven Pasquale as Luke Maynard
 Bobby Cannavale as Adam
 Enrique Murciano as Harry
 Danielle Nicolet as Candace
 Vanessa Marano as Imogen Hicks
 David Andrews as Swan Carter
 Elizabeth Bogush as Trudy Rumson
 Burgess Jenkins as Jeff Rumson
 Annie Potts as Vivienne Carter
 Kenny Alfonso as Jack
 Javier Carrasquillo as Ward
 Susan Mansur as Judge Barbour
 Elizabeth Omilami as Kim

External links
 
 
 

2010 American television series debuts
2010 American television series endings
2010s American comedy television miniseries
2010s American romantic comedy television series
English-language television shows
Lifetime (TV network) original programming
Television shows filmed in Atlanta
Wedding television shows
Asian-American television
Films directed by James Hayman